Demiurge is an artisan-like figure in some philosophies responsible for fashioning and maintaining the physical universe.

Demiurge may also refer to:

 Demiurge (magistrate), a magistrate in Peloponnesian and other Ancient Greek city-states
 Demiurge Studios, a video game developer
 Demiurge Unit, an LED design company
 Project Demiurge, an unpublished expansion of Heresy: Kingdom Come
 "Demiurge", a song by Meshuggah on their 2012 album Koloss

See also

 Demiourgoi, a skilled-worker middle class
 Michael Demiurgos, a fictional character
 Demiurg, a fictional race of T'au Empire-aligned aliens in the Warhammer 40,000 setting